Robert Peacock Paterson (1 October 1927 – 27 August 2011) was a Scottish footballer who played in the Scottish League for Queen's Park and Aberdeen as a right back. He was capped by Scotland at amateur level and made one friendly appearance for Great Britain.

References 

Scottish footballers
Scottish Football League players
Queen's Park F.C. players
Association football fullbacks
Scotland amateur international footballers
Aberdeen F.C. players
Dumbarton F.C. players
Footballers from Edinburgh
1927 births

2011 deaths